The 1957 Long Beach State 49ers football team represented Long Beach State College—now known as California State University, Long Beach—as a member of the California Collegiate Athletic Association (CCAA) during the 1957 NCAA College Division football season. Led by Mike DeLotto in his third and final season as head coach, the 49ers compiled an overall record of 3–5 with a mark of 0–3 in conference play, placing last out of six teams in the CCAA. The team played home games at Veterans Memorial Stadium adjacent to the campus of Long Beach City College in Long Beach, California.

Schedule

References

Long Beach State
Long Beach State 49ers football seasons
Long Beach State 49ers football